Jenison is an unincorporated community in Michigan, United States.

Jenison may also refer to:

 Jenison (surname)
 Jenison Public Schools, public school district in Jenison, Michigan
 Jenison High School, high school in Jenison, Michigan
 Jenison Fieldhouse, arena in East Lansing, Michigan
 Robert Jenison House, historic house in Natick, Massachusetts
 Jenison Shafto (1728–1771), English politician, and race-horse owner
 Jenison William Gordon (1747–1831), English baron and sheriff
 Jenison (footballer) (born 1991), Jenison de Jesus Brito e Brito, Brazilian footballer